Each team was required to submit a list of not more than 21 players, of which three were required to be designated as goalkeepers. Only the numbers 1 to 21 were permitted to be used, with the number 1 being assigned one of the designated goalkeepers.

Names in bold went on to earn full international caps.

Group A

Congo
Head coach:  Eddie Hudanski

Mexico
Head coach: Raúl Gutiérrez

Netherlands
Head coach: Albert Stuivenberg

North Korea
Head coach: An Ye-gun

Group B

Argentina
Head coach: Oscar Garré

France
Head coach: Patrick Gonfalone

Jamaica
Head coach: Wendell Downswell

Japan
Head coach: Hirofumi Yoshitake

Group C

Canada
Head coach: Sean Fleming

England
Head coach: John Peacock

Rwanda
Head coach:  Richard Tardy

Uruguay
Head coach: Fabián Coito

Group D

Czech Republic
Head coach: Josef Csaplár

New Zealand
Head coach: Aaron McFarland

United States
Head coach:  Wilmer Cabrera

Uzbekistan
Head coach: Alexei Evstafeev

Group E

Burkina Faso
Head coach:  Rui Pereira

Ecuador
Head coach: Javier Rodríguez

Germany
Head coach: Steffen Freund

Panama
Head coach: Jorge Dely Valdés

Group F

Australia
Head coach:  Jan Versleijen

Brazil
Head coach: Emerson Ávila

Ivory Coast
Head coach: Pierre Gouaméné

Denmark
Head coach: Thomas Frank

References

External links
 Official players list

FIFA U-17 World Cup squads